Theresa Stephanie Boade (born February 3, 1999) is an American professional soccer player who plays as a midfielder for North Carolina Courage of the National Women's Soccer League (NWSL), She played college soccer for the Duke Blue Devils, and also trained with the US U-19 and U-18 Women's national team.

Early life 
Boade was born in Dallas, Texas before moving to Golden, Colorado where she grew up. For high school she attended Valor Christian where she competed in basketball, soccer and track.

Club career 
Boade signed a two year contract with the Courage on March 18, 2022. She then made her professional debut with the team the next day during a NWSL Challenge Cup match against the NJ/NY Gotham FC.

In November 2022, Boade joined Australian A-League Women club Western Sydney Wanderers on loan. Her loan was originally scheduled until February 2023, however a month later it ended early due to a shoulder injury she suffered during the Sydney Derby.

Honors

Club

Professional 
 NWSL Challenge Cup Champion: 2022

Collegiate 

 NCAA Tournament Final 4: 2017
 NCAA Tournament Elite 8: 2021, 2020*
 NCAA Tournament Sweet 16: 2018

*Played in Spring 2021 due to Covid-19.

Individual

Collegiate 

 First Team All ACC: 2021
 All ACC Academic Team: 2021
 ACC Honor Roll: 2021, 2018

References

1999 births
Living people
American women's soccer players
North Carolina Courage players
Western Sydney Wanderers FC (A-League Women) players
National Women's Soccer League players
Duke Blue Devils women's soccer players
21st-century American women
Women's association football midfielders
People from Highlands Ranch, Colorado
NJ/NY Gotham FC draft picks